La cruz is a 1997 Argentine drama film directed by Alejandro Agresti. It was screened in the Un Certain Regard section at the 1997 Cannes Film Festival.

Cast
 Norman Briski - Alfredo
 Mirta Busnelli - Eloisa
 Carlos Roffé - Pablo
 Laura Melillo - Claudia
 Harry Havilio
 Silvana Silveri
 Sebastián Polonski
 Silvana Ramírez
 Pascual Condito
 Alejandro Agresti

References

External links

1997 films
1990s Spanish-language films
1997 drama films
Films directed by Alejandro Agresti
Argentine drama films
1990s Argentine films